Éric Ciotti (born 28 September 1965) is a French politician who has represented the 1st constituency of Alpes-Maritimes in the National Assembly since 2007 and is the president of The Republicans since 2022. Ciotti previously briefly served as First Deputy Mayor of Nice under Mayor Christian Estrosi in 2008, before he assumed the presidency of the Departmental Council of Alpes-Maritimes from 2008 to 2017.

A member of The Republicans (LR), he sought the party's nomination for the 2022 presidential election at its 2021 congress; he placed first in the first round of voting but was defeated by Valérie Pécresse in the second round. In December 2022, he was elected president of The Republicans, placing first in the first round and winning the second round against Bruno Retailleau.

Political career

Early career in local politics
Ciotti was elected to the General Council of Alpes-Maritimes in 2008 in Saint-Martin-Vésubie following the resignation of incumbent councillor Gaston Franco. He was elected by his peers to the body's presidency the same year, succeeding Nice Mayor Christian Estrosi. Ciotti had previously failed to be elected in the canton of Nice-1 in the 2008 cantonal election, having been defeated by incumbent Socialist Marc Concas. Following the 2015 departmental election, in which he was elected in Tourrette-Levens, the Departmental Council of Alpes-Maritimes replaced the General Council of Alpes-Maritimes. After the adoption of a new law organising cumul des mandats restrictions, Ciotti resigned the presidency in 2017 while keeping his councillor mandate.

Member of the National Assembly, 2007–present

Ciotti was elected to the National Assembly during the 2007 election; he was reelected in 2012 and 2017.

In parliament, Ciotti has been serving on the Committee on Legal Affairs since 2007. Since 2017, he has also been a quaestor and therefore part of the Assembly's Bureau in the 15th legislature of the French Fifth Republic, under the leadership of president Richard Ferrand. He recently recognized having had an affair with Nadine Morano while in office.

Ahead of the UMP's 2012 leadership election, Ciotti managed François Fillon's campaign. When Fillon's opponent Jean-François Copé eventually won, Ciotti was one of more than 50 party members who threatened to form a new centre-right caucus within the UMP parliamentary group under the leadership of Fillon.

In September 2014, Ciotti joined Fillon, Étienne Blanc, Pierre Lellouche and Valérie Pécresse on an official trip to Iraq.

Ahead of the Republicans' 2016 primaries, Ciotti managed former President Nicolas Sarkozy's campaign for the presidential nomination, alongside Catherine Vautrin. Also in 2016, he formally requested that prosecutors investigate President François Hollande over a potential breach of security allowing revelations that Hollande disclosed classified information to journalists.

Amid the Fillon affair, Ciotti succeeded Gérald Darmanin as deputy of the Republicans' secretary general Bernard Accoyer and subsequently became a vocal defender of Fillon as the party's candidate for the 2017 presidential election. When magistrates put Fillon under formal investigation on suspicion of embezzling state funds, Ciotti publicly state "I trust and support Francois Fillon more than ever". When Fillon called on members to vote for Emmanuel Macron in the second round of the election against Marine Le Pen, Ciotti refused to endorse Macron.

In The Republicans' 2017 leadership election, Ciotti endorsed Laurent Wauquiez. In 2018, Wauquiez included him in his shadow cabinet; in this capacity, he served as opposition counterpart to Minister of the Interior Christophe Castaner.

In 2020, Ciotti became the Parliament's rapporteur on how the government handled the COVID-19 pandemic in France.

In 2021, Ciotti announced his intention to run as The Republicans's candidate in the 2022 presidential election. Ciotti narrowly placed first at the 2021 The Republicans congress and proceeded to the primary second round, in which he was defeated by Valérie Pécresse.

Founding of “The Right” movement, 2021–present 
À DROITE! (ÀD!), also called Droits, (English: To the Right!), is a French movement within The Republicans. The movement was founded by Ciotti during the 2021 The Republicans congress.

Leader of The Republicans, 2022–present 
Ciotti was elected with 53.7% of the votes against his main opponent, Bruno Retailleau, who received 46.3% to become the next leader of The Republicans. He ruled out a formal alliance with Macron's minority government in parliament, although he was open to negotiate a pension reform.

Political positions

Ciotti has largely been described as right-wing and of belonging in the populist faction of The Republicans.

Domestic policy 
In 2019, Ciotti successfully added an amendment to an education bill to make it mandatory for classrooms to display both a French and European Union flag in all classrooms.

In 2020, Ciotti proposed a bill to the National Assembly which would prohibit the dissemination of images depicting functions of the national police, municipal police, military and customs officers; with a maximum penalty of 15,000 euros and a year in prison for violators.

For the Marianne magazine, Éric Ciotti joined Marine Le Pen's positions on security, identity, immigration and Islamism, sharing with her "an ethnic and identity-based vision of the nation". He thus proposes to change the nationality code in order to abolish the jus soli in favour of the jus sanguinis alone, to include in the Constitution "our Christian origins", as well as to accentuate security policies (creation of 100,000 additional prison places, lowering of the criminal majority to 16 years, suppression of family allowances to "parents of children who do not respect the values of the Republic"). He seems to adhere to the Great Replacement theory; in 2021, he stated "our society is changing, if we have to talk about 'great replacement', I talk about 'replacement'".

In 2021, he stated that "what differentiates [The Republicans] from the National Rally is our capacity to govern. In the face of Islamic terrorism, he advocated the creation of a "French-style Guantanamo", where Camembert cheese would be used to re-educate, and the adoption of "specially adapted laws, like the Patriot Act in the United States.

In September of 2021, Ciotti declared that if the second round of the French presidential election ended up being between Emmanuel Macron and Éric Zemmour, he would vote for the latter.

On economic issues, he defends, as part of his candidacy for the primary of his party for the presidential election of 2022, the elimination of 250,000 positions in the civil service, the return to 39 hours as the legal duration of working time, raising the retirement age to 65, the lowering of corporate taxes, the abolition of inheritance tax as well as the reduction of unemployment benefits and social assistance.

During the protests against Emmanuel Macron's pension reforms, Ciotti's office in Nice was attacked. According to a photo posted by Ciotti to his Twitter account, the front window of the office had been broken with a paving stone and vandals wrote "the motion or the stone", in reference to an upcoming vote in the National Assembly. Protests against pension measures have taken place across the country, affecting various industries.

Foreign policy
During his presidential campaign in 2021, Ciotti argued that France should reassert itself by leaving NATO's integrated command.

He claims an "immense admiration" for the state of Israel and wants the recognition of Jerusalem as the unified capital of that country, as well as the transfer of the French embassy in Israel from Tel Aviv to Jerusalem, in order to "break with a form of diplomatic tradition that is globally pro-Arab" of France.

Other activities
 French Office for the Protection of Refugees and Stateless Persons (OFPRA), Member of the Board of Directors

References

1965 births
Living people
21st-century French politicians
French people of Italian descent
Union for a Popular Movement politicians
The Republicans (France) politicians
Sciences Po alumni
People from Nice
Right-wing populism in France
Deputies of the 13th National Assembly of the French Fifth Republic
Deputies of the 14th National Assembly of the French Fifth Republic
Deputies of the 15th National Assembly of the French Fifth Republic
Departmental councillors (France)
Presidents of French departments